The Shimmer Tag Team Championship (stylized as SHIMMER Tag Team Championship) is a professional wrestling tag team championship in Shimmer Women Athletes. The title is recognized nationally by Ring of Honor, and also by several independent promotions, including American Luchacore, Insanity Pro Wrestling and Shine Wrestling, where it has also been defended. It has also been defended in Japan at Joshi 4 Hope independent events.

History
Since the creation of the Shimmer Championship, there was a growing interest in creating a Shimmer Tag Team Championship. This was stemmed from a growing number of teams such as The Experience and The Minnesota Home Wrecking Crew, and frequent tag team matches on the cards of Shimmer events. In October 2008, the first champions were crowned when the duo of Ashley Lane and Nevaeh won a Gauntlet Match involving six teams at Shimmer Volume 21.

Reigns

Combined reigns

By team

By wrestler

See also
Heart of Shimmer Championship
Shimmer Championship
Shine Tag Team Championship
Women's World Tag Team Championship

References
General

Specific

External links
Shimmer Tag Team Championship

2008 in professional wrestling
Women's professional wrestling tag team championships
Shimmer Women Athletes championships